Eunica pomona, the rounded purplewing, is a species of butterfly of the family Nymphalidae.

Description
The uppersides of the anterior wings are black, with a bright blue band from the base of the coastal margin to the apex. Posterior wings have a broad submarginal band of blue. The undersides of the anterior wings are brown, lighter at the base and the inner margin, while the apex is greyish. The posterior wings are dark brown with two black spots in the middle, followed by some irregular transverse dark brown bands.

Distribution
This species occurs in Venezuela, Colombia, Costa Rica, and Panama.

Subspecies
Eunica pomona pomona (Colombia)
Eunica pomona amata Druce, 1874 (Costa Rica, Panama)

References

"Eunica Hübner, [1819]" at Markku Savela's Lepidoptera and Some Other Life Forms

External links
Eunica pomona amata, Butterflies of America

Biblidinae
Butterflies described in 1867
Nymphalidae of South America
Taxa named by Baron Cajetan von Felder
Taxa named by Rudolf Felder